Kelly Ann Ayotte (born June 27, 1968) is an American attorney and politician who served as a United States senator from New Hampshire from 2011 to 2017. A member of the Republican Party, Ayotte served as New Hampshire Attorney General from 2004 to 2009. 

Born and raised in Nashua, New Hampshire, Ayotte is a graduate of Nashua High School, Pennsylvania State University and Villanova University School of Law. She worked as a law clerk for the New Hampshire Supreme Court before entering private practice. She served as a prosecutor for the New Hampshire Department of Justice, and briefly served as the legal counsel to New Hampshire Governor Craig Benson, before returning to the Department of Justice to serve as Deputy Attorney General of New Hampshire.

In June 2004, Governor Benson appointed Ayotte as Attorney General of New Hampshire, after the resignation of Peter Heed. She became the first and only woman to serve as New Hampshire's Attorney General, serving from 2004 to 2009, after she was twice reappointed by Democratic governor John Lynch. In July 2009, Ayotte resigned as Attorney General to pursue a bid for the U.S. Senate, after three-term incumbent Judd Gregg announced his retirement from the Senate.

In September 2010, Ayotte won a close victory over lawyer Ovide M. Lamontagne in the Republican primary for the U.S. Senate. She then defeated Democratic congressman Paul Hodes in the general election with 60% of the vote and was sworn into the U.S. Senate as a member of the 112th Congress on January 3, 2011. Ayotte was mentioned as a possible running mate for Republican nominee Mitt Romney in the 2012 presidential election.

In 2016, Ayotte was defeated in her bid for reelection by Democratic Governor Maggie Hassan by a very narrow margin of 1,017 votes (0.14%). After President Trump nominated Judge Neil Gorsuch to the United States Supreme Court, the administration chose Ayotte to lead the White House team escorting the nominee to meetings and hearings on Capitol Hill.
Ayotte was chosen by Senator John McCain to deliver a Bible reading at his memorial service in Washington D.C. on September 1, 2018.

Early life, education, and career
Ayotte was born in Nashua, New Hampshire, on June 27, 1968, the daughter of Kathleen M. (née Sullivan) and Marc Frederick Ayotte. Her father's family is of French-Canadian descent. Ayotte attended Nashua High School and received a B.A. from Pennsylvania State University in political science. While at Penn State, she was initiated into the Delta Gamma sorority. In 1993, Ayotte received a J.D. from Villanova University School of Law, where she had served as editor of the Environmental Law Journal.

Ayotte clerked for Sherman D. Horton, associate justice of the New Hampshire Supreme Court, for one year. From 1994 to 1998, she was an associate at McLane, Graf, Raulerson & Middleton, a Manchester law firm.

In 1998, Ayotte joined the office of the New Hampshire Attorney General as a prosecutor. In 2001, she married Joseph Daley, a pilot in the National Guard. In 2003, Ayotte became legal counsel to Governor Craig Benson. Three months later, she returned to the Attorney General's office as Deputy Attorney General. In June 2004, Governor Benson appointed Ayotte as Attorney General of the State of New Hampshire after Peter Heed resigned. Ayotte had both of her children while serving as the first and only female New Hampshire Attorney General.

New Hampshire Attorney General

Clean air emissions standards
Ayotte joined Attorneys General from eight other states to sue federal regulators over a rules change that made clean air emissions standards for power plants less strict and eliminated clean air reporting and monitoring requirements.

In 2005, the court agreed with Ayotte and the others that the Environmental Protection Agency must measure changes in the emissions from power plants and could not exempt power plants from reporting their emissions.

Prosecution of murder cases 
As assistant attorney general, Ayotte prosecuted two defendants for the 2001 Dartmouth College murders in Etna, New Hampshire.

As attorney general, Ayotte prosecuted the high-profile case surrounding the 2006 murder of Manchester police officer Michael Briggs in the line of duty. It resulted in a conviction and death penalty sentence. Members of Briggs's family praised her leadership in television ads for her 2010 Senate campaign.

Ayotte v. Planned Parenthood of Northern New England

In 2003, the United States District Court for the District of New Hampshire found the Parental Notification Prior to Abortion Act, a New Hampshire law requiring parental notification of a minor's abortion, unconstitutional, and enjoined its enforcement. In 2004, New Hampshire Attorney General Peter Heed appealed the ruling to the United States Court of Appeals for the First Circuit, which affirmed the district court's ruling. In 2004, Ayotte appealed the First Circuit's ruling to the Supreme Court, over the objection of incoming Democratic Governor John Lynch. Ayotte personally argued the case before the Supreme Court.
The Supreme Court unanimously vacated the district court's ruling and remanded the case back to the district court, holding that it was improper for the district court to invalidate the statute completely instead of just severing the problematic portions of the statute or enjoining the statute's unconstitutional applications. In 2007, the law was repealed by the New Hampshire legislature, mooting the need for a rehearing by the district court.

In 2008, Planned Parenthood sued to recover its attorney fees and court costs from the New Hampshire Department of Justice. In 2009, Ayotte, as attorney general, authorized a payment of $300,000 to Planned Parenthood to settle the suit.

New Hampshire Institute of Politics
Ayotte served as a board member of the Public Advisory Board at the New Hampshire Institute of Politics at Saint Anselm College while Attorney General. In March 2011 she returned to the Institute as a senator to talk to political science students.

On May 28, 2013, Ayotte attended a forum at Saint Anselm College to explain the Never Contract With the Enemy Act (S. 675), which she co-sponsored with Richard Blumenthal (D-CT). She was accompanied by Special Inspector General for Iraq Reconstruction Stuart Bowen. They addressed military contractor fraud and how to prevent funds paid to military contractors in Afghanistan and Iraq from winding up in the hands of parties hostile to the United States.

U.S. Senate

Elections

2010 

Ayotte resigned as attorney general on July 7, 2009, to explore a run for U.S. Senate in 2010. The crowded Republican primary field included former congressional and gubernatorial candidate Ovide M. Lamontagne, businessman and owner of NH1 News William Harrison Binnie, and State Representative Tom Alciere. Ayotte had never run for office, but narrowly won the primary election on September 14, 2010. In the general election, Ayotte defeated Democratic nominee U.S. Representative Paul Hodes, Libertarian nominee Ken Blevens, and Independent Chris Booth with 60 percent of the vote.

Endorsements

Ayotte was endorsed by John McCain, Sarah Palin, John Thune, Tom Coburn, Mitt Romney, Tim Pawlenty, Haley Barbour, and Rick Santorum. According to one senior GOP aide, "The addition of a Republican woman from New England who's young, who's a mom … all of these things broaden the Republican party's appeal and say to different segments of the population, 'This party has folks in it that are just like you.'"

2016 

In 2016, Ayotte ran for reelection to the U.S. Senate against Maggie Hassan, New Hampshire's sitting governor.

In February 2016, the Koch Brothers-linked conservative advocacy group Americans for Prosperity announced that Ayotte was the lone vulnerable Republican U.S. Senator the group would not be supporting in 2016, due to Ayotte's support for the Clean Power Plan to combat climate change.

On May 4, 2016, an Ayotte spokeswoman said Ayotte "intends to support the Republican nominee" for U.S. President but did not plan to make an endorsement. In October 2016, after lewd sexual comments Republican nominee Donald Trump made in a 2005 video came to light, Ayotte said that as a mother and a former prosecutor who had worked with victims, she could no longer vote for Trump, and would write in Mike Pence for president.

Ayotte lost the election to Hassan by 1,017 votes.

Endorsements
Ayotte was endorsed by the New Hampshire Troopers' Association, the New England Narcotics Enforcement Officers' Association, and the Manchester Police Patrolmen's Association.

Ayotte was endorsed by the New Hampshire Union Leader, the Nashua Telegraph, the Caledonian-Record, and the Portsmouth Herald. The Herald endorsement was notable as it had endorsed Ayotte's opponent, Maggie Hassan, in Hassan's prior runs for office.

Tenure

Jobs and the economy
Ayotte partnered with Chris Coons, a Democrat from Delaware, to offer the Manufacturing Skills Act and the Manufacturing Universities Act. Both bills were aimed at better preparing students for 21st century jobs and connecting graduates with employers who have jobs sitting open for lack of skilled workers.

She helped include provisions in the Every Student Succeeds Act to boost STEM education, particularly among girls and underrepresented minorities, and to support career and technical education in schools.

Ayotte strongly opposed the National Oceanic and Atmospheric Administration's proposal to pass significant at-sea monitoring costs to New Hampshire's fishermen and brought NOAA officials to New Hampshire to hear from fishermen impacted. NOAA later backed off.

National security
Ayotte served on the Senate Armed Services and Homeland Security Committees, and was widely regarded as a leader on national security and foreign policy.

Ayotte led legislative efforts to keep terrorists at Guantanamo Bay rather than closing that base and transferring them to U.S. soil.

She has been an outspoken critic of the Iran nuclear deal, noting that Iran is the largest state sponsor of terrorism in the world. She proposed strict new sanctions on Iran.

Ayotte was critical of the Obama administration's response to ISIS, and released a comprehensive plan to destroy ISIS.

Heroin epidemic
Ayotte was one of four senators, two Republicans and two Democrats, who introduced the Comprehensive Addiction and Recovery Act, federal legislation to support local solutions and implement a comprehensive federal strategy to tackle the heroin and prescription opioid abuse epidemic. The bill was structured around prevention, treatment, recovery, and support for first responders.

Ayotte also co-sponsored bills to better care for infants born addicted or in withdrawal and help expectant and new mothers struggling with addiction get treatment. She backed successful efforts to better look after kids in schools who are struggling with addiction issues at home and to stop the flow of drugs across the southern border.

College affordability
She offered the Student Loan Relief Act to allow borrowers to refinance their student loans at interest rates lower than the federal rate.

Ayotte cosponsored legislation to establish a single, simplified income-driven student loan repayment option and to make it easier for employers to assist their employees with loan repayment.

Ayotte was a vocal proponent of reauthorizing the Perkins Loan program, as she argued roughly 5,000 New Hampshire students relied on it.

Ayotte supported making the money that parents save for their kids' college tax-free.

Military and veterans issues 
Ayotte routinely included provisions in annual defense authorization bills that support the important work being done at Portsmouth Naval Shipyard, Pease Air National Guard Base, and by the New Hampshire National Guard. She is also strongly opposed to further rounds of the base realignment and closing commission.

Ayotte included provisions in the Veterans' Access to Care through Choice, Accountability, and Transparency Act of 2014 to allow New Hampshire veterans to receive medical care closer to home.

She was the only member of the New Hampshire delegation to vote against a budget proposal the singled out veterans' benefits for cuts. She has offered and cosponsored legislation to give veterans access to cutting edge prosthetics, strengthen mental health services for veterans and their families, and improve the support system for military families.

Fiscal policy and taxes
Ayotte supported comprehensive tax reform to simplify the tax code and lower rates. She has said she believes it would help bring back trillions of dollars parked overseas.

In December 2015, Ayotte voted to suspend the Medical Device Tax, which she says threatens nearly 3,500 manufacturing jobs in New Hampshire. She is also a leading opponent of the Internet sales tax.

Ayotte supported a balanced budget amendment to the Constitution and helped pass the Senate's first balanced budget in fourteen years.

Ayotte offered a variety of legislation to eliminate wasteful spending and duplicate or unnecessary programs.

Women and family policies
Ayotte offered the Gender Advancement in Pay Act to implement New Hampshire's equal pay law at the federal level, as explained under in "Labor issues".

Ayotte and Democratic New Hampshire Senator Jeanne Shaheen co-sponsored a bill to combat pregnancy discrimination in the workplace and ensure expectant mothers can continue working during their pregnancy.

She offered and cosponsored legislation to make it easier for employers to offer flex-time to working parents and to expand access to affordable childcare.

Legislation
Ayotte sponsored 217 bills, including:

112th Congress (2011–2012)
 S. 944 and S. 982, bills to keep the Guantanamo Bay detention camp open, to prohibit prisoners held there from being released back to their country of origin, and to prohibit the construction or modification of any facilities used to house any individual under detention at Guantanamo, introduced May 11 and 12, 2011
 S. 1704, a bill to reduce the number of strategic airlift aircraft used by the United States Air Force from 316 to 301, introduced October 13, 2011
 S. 1996, a bill to require the Congressional Budget Office to release macroeconomic reports alongside its budget reports for major bills and resolutions (which the bill defines), introduced December 15, 2011, reintroduced in the 113th Congress as S. 184
 S. 2320, a bill to treat Clark Veterans Cemetery in the Republic of the Philippines as a permanent military cemetery in a foreign country under the purview of the American Battle Monuments Commission, and to have the Commission restore and maintain the cemetery, introduced April 19, 2012. While this bill did not become law, an agreement has since been made between the U.S. and Philippine governments to do what the bill intended.

113th Congress (2013–2014)
 S. 31, a bill to permanently ban state and local governments from imposing taxes on the access to the internet and on goods sold by means of the internet, introduced January 22, 2013.
 S. 263, a bill to prohibit federal agencies from hiring more than one employee for every three full-time employees who leave employment from that agency until the Office of Management and Budget determines that employment in that agency is at least 10% less than it was previously, and to prohibit members of Congress from receiving a cost-of-living adjustment (COLA) in their pay in years in which the federal government has a budget deficit, introduced February 7, 2013.
 S. 862, a bill to allow certain individuals to be exempted from the Patient Protection and Affordable Care Act's minimum essential health care coverage requirements if one's religious beliefs would cause them to object to medical care provided under any of the requirements, introduced May 6, 2013.
 S. 1406, introduced July 31, 2013, a bill to permit the Secretary of Agriculture to issue regulations for the issuance of permits for people hired for the management of horse shows, exhibitions, auctions, and sales, requiring all such individuals to be qualified to identify instances of soring. Individuals receiving the permits must be cleared of any potential conflicts of interest and preference is to be given to accredited veterinarians. The bill further makes it a crime for any person to sell, auction, exhibit, or race any sore horse, and bans Tennessee Walking Horses, Racking horses, and Spotted Saddle horses from being sold, auctioned, exhibited, or raced if they are equipped with any action device (which the bill defines) or equipment that would alter the gait of the horse. A companion bill has been introduced in the House of Representatives as H.R. 1518.
 S. 1764, a bill to prohibit the Department of Defense from retiring the Fairchild Republic A-10 Thunderbolt II until a sufficient number of Lockheed Martin F-35 Lightning IIs have been constructed to replace the existing A-10s, introduced November 21, 2013.
 S. 1869, a bill to repeal the provision of the Bipartisan Budget Act of 2013 that reduces the COLA to the retirement pay of members of the Armed Forces under age 62, and to require individuals claiming the refundable portion of the child tax credit to include their Social Security number on their tax returns, introduced December 19, 2013. The first part of this bill is identical to another bill, S. 1963, sponsored by Senator Mark Pryor.
 S. 1977, which has the same provisions as S. 1869, but also requires the name and Social Security number of the qualifying child of the individual claiming the tax credit to be on the tax return, introduced January 30, 2014.
 S. 2355 and S. 2377, bills to exempt from the federal income tax any benefits received from a disability program for public safety officers if such disability was acquired as a result of an injury sustained in the line of duty, introduced May 20 and 21, 2014.

Committee assignments (114th Congress)

 Committee on Armed Services
 Subcommittee on Emerging Threats and Capabilities
 Subcommittee on Readiness and Management Support (Chair)
 Subcommittee on Seapower
 Committee on the Budget
 Committee on Commerce, Science, and Transportation
 Subcommittee on Aviation Operations, Safety, and Security (Chair)
 Subcommittee on Communications, Technology, and the Internet
 Subcommittee on Oceans, Atmosphere, Fisheries, and Coast Guard
 Subcommittee on Surface Transportation and Merchant Marine Infrastructure, Safety, and Security
 Committee on Homeland Security and Governmental Affairs
 Permanent Subcommittee on Investigations
 Federal Spending Oversight and Emergency Management
 Committee on Small Business and Entrepreneurship

Awards 
During her time in the Senate, Ayotte received a number of awards for her legislative activity from various civic organizations and interest groups, including the National Retail Federation, CCAGW PAC, the AARP, Save the Children, the New Hampshire Veterans of Foreign Wars, the National Association of Police Organizations, and the Appalachian Trail Conservancy.

After the Senate
Ayotte has been named to several corporate boards of directors, including Caterpillar Inc., News Corp., BAE Systems, Boston Properties, Blink Health, Bloom Energy, and Blackstone Group.

Political positions

Ayotte has been described as both a conservative Republican and a centrist. After her 2010 election, the Associated Press referred to Ayotte as "a conservative Republican" and two years later, NBC News described her "unique identity in the Senate as a Northeastern conservative Republican woman." She demonstrated centrist tendencies in her voting record, including working with Democrats on some issues. The New York Times described her as a moderate Republican. The Lugar Center at Georgetown University ranked Ayotte as the 11th most bipartisan member of the U.S. Senate during the 113th Congress. The American Conservative Union gave her a 64% lifetime score and the progressive Americans for Democratic Action gave her a 35% score; the nonpartisan National Journal gave her a composite score of 67% conservative and 33% liberal based on her voting record.

Immigration policy
Ayotte voted for the comprehensive immigration reform bill (the Border Security, Economic Opportunity, and Immigration Modernization Act of 2013) brought forward by the bipartisan Gang of Eight, calling it a "a thoughtful, bipartisan solution to a tough problem." She has been a vocal critic of the practice of sanctuary cities and voted to withhold federal funding from municipalities that refuse to cooperate with federal immigration officials.

Ayotte did not support Hillary Clinton's proposal to bring an additional 65,000 Syrian refugees to the United States, unless stricter vetting was implemented to "guarantee to the American people that none of the individuals that are being brought to the United States have any connections to ISIS."

Economic policy

Minimum wage
Ayotte opposes increasing the minimum wage, and opposes federal legislation to index the minimum wage to inflation, reflecting adjustments in the cost of living. Ayotte said she supports the current federal minimum wage, but that "each state should decide what is best" when it comes to raising it.

Social Security
In 2010, Ayotte said she was open to raising the Social Security retirement age for younger workers in an effort to avoid long-term insolvency, but does not support changes for people at or near retirement.

Labor issues
Ayotte opposed passage of the Employee Free Choice Act ("Card Check"), which would have amended the National Labor Relations Act to allow employees to unionize whenever the National Labor Relations Board verified that 50% of the employees had signed authorization cards, therefore bypassing a secret ballot election.

In April 2014, the Senate debated the Paycheck Fairness Act. The bill would have punished employers for retaliating against workers who share wage information and put the justification burden on employers as to why someone is paid less while allowing workers to sue for punitive damages of wage discrimination. Ayotte said that one of her reasons for voting against ending debate on the bill was that Majority Leader Harry Reid had refused to allow votes on any of the amendments that Republicans had suggested for the bill. Ayotte went on to offer her own equal pay bill, the Gender Advancement in Pay Act, which would implement New Hampshire's equal pay law at the federal level, but "a little stronger in its anti-retaliation provision because it explicitly addresses written policies."

Ayotte voted in April 2014 to extend federal funding for unemployment benefits.  Federal funding had been initiated in 2008 and expired at the end of 2013.

In March 2015, Ayotte voted for an amendment to establish a deficit-neutral reserve fund to allow employees to earn paid sick time. Ayotte also offered a bill to give private sector employers the statutory authority to offer optional flex-time.

Fiscal policy (taxes and spending)
Ayotte favors passage of a balanced budget amendment to the U.S. Constitution. She has advocated for such a constitutional amendment as a member of the Senate Budget Committee.

In 2010, Ayotte criticized the 2008 bailouts, saying "I wouldn't have supported the TARP or the bailouts... I do not think we should have bailed out the private sector."

Ayotte has called for federal budget cuts to reduce the federal debt and deficits, proposing in 2010 that every government department cut its budget by 20 percent from current levels, though "some may cut more, some may cut less."

Ayotte favors the permanent repeal of the estate tax and has co-sponsored legislation to repeal the tax.

During the standoff over increasing the national debt limit in 2011, Ayotte pushed for greater cuts in government spending and voted against the eventual deal.

Ayotte has pushed to end congressional earmarks, and has co-sponsored legislation that would permanently ban the practice.

Financial regulation
Ayotte opposed the Dodd–Frank Wall Street Reform and Consumer Protection Act. Ayotte said that the legislation failed to directly address problems with Fannie Mae and Freddie Mac, and that the Act imposed additional regulatory burdens on community banks.

Climate and energy
In 2010, when asked about climate change, Ayotte acknowledged that "there is scientific evidence that demonstrates there is some impact from human activities" but stated that "I don't think the evidence is conclusive." She opposed both a cap-and-trade system and a carbon tax to reduce carbon emissions. In 2011, she voted to limit the EPA's ability to regulate greenhouse gas emissions. In 2012, Ayotte voted with four other Republican senators to defeat a proposal to block the Environmental Protection Agency from promulgating the first federal standards regulating air pollution from power plants. In 2013, she voted for a point of order opposing a carbon tax or a fee on carbon emissions.

Ayotte was one of two Republican senators to vote against a Republican measure, introduced by Roy Blunt, that sought to block President Obama from negotiating an international agreement on climate change. She voted to fast-track approval for the Keystone XL pipeline project.

In October 2015, Ayotte became the first congressional Republican to endorse a measure by President Barack Obama dubbed the Clean Power Plan, a measure that would seek a 32 percent cut in the power sector's carbon emissions. That same year she was one of five Republican senators to vote to pass a non-binding amendment stating that "climate change is real and human activity significantly contributes to climate change."

Health care
Ayotte supports state-administered healthcare programs such as SCHIP and federal tax credits that serve to reduce the number of uninsured.

In November 2013, amid growing concerns over the launch of HealthCare.gov, particularly relating to delays associated with initial online signups for health coverage, Ayotte called for a "time-out" on the Affordable Care Act during a televised interview with CNN, suggesting instead to "convene a group of bipartisan leaders to address health care concerns in this country because this is not working."

Ayotte was given the American Foundation for Suicide Prevention's Congressional Award in recognition of her support for increasing mental health resources.

Ayotte advocated for passage of the Comprehensive Addiction and Recovery Act (CARA), which is intended to address opioid abuse. The bill would increase funding for treatment of addiction and allow nurses and physician assistants to treat addicts with medication, which Ayotte says would increase the treatment options available.

Judiciary
Ayotte joined with the rest of the Senate Republicans in refusing to hold a hearing on the nomination of Judge Merrick Garland to the Supreme Court.

Social issues

Abortion and reproductive rights
Ayotte believes abortion should be prohibited except in cases of rape, incest, or danger to the life of the mother.

While in the Senate, Ayotte offered legislation to make birth control available over-the-counter without a prescription, which she argued would increase access and allow flexible spending accounts and health savings accounts to be used to purchase it. She voted to shift federal funding from Planned Parenthood to other community health centers that also serve low- and middle-income women and families, but opposed an attempt to shut down the federal government over the issue. Ayotte was given a 100% rating by National Right to Life and an 82% by the pro-life Campaign for Working Families. NARAL Pro-Choice America gave her a 15% rating and pro-choice Planned Parenthood gave her a 6% rating.

Same-sex marriage and LGBT rights
Speaking about gay marriage, Ayotte said in 2010: "Ultimately I do think this is a matter for the states and states should decide how to define marriage. New Hampshire's already made that decision and I respect the decision." In 2015, Ayotte was one of eleven U.S. Senate Republicans who voted to extend Social Security and veterans' benefits to all legally married same-sex couples. In November 2013, Ayotte was one of 10 Senate Republicans who voted in favor of the Employment Non-Discrimination Act, which passed by a vote of 64–32. Human Rights Campaign, which supports same-sex marriage and other gay rights, gave Ayotte an 80% rating.

Violence Against Women Act
Ayotte voted for reauthorization of the Violence Against Women Act in 2012. In 2014, Ayotte and Missouri Democratic Senator Claire McCaskill led passage of a bill to reform the way the military handles sexual assaults, increase prosecutions, and improve support for survivors. In 2015, Ayotte and New York Democratic Senator Kirsten Gillibrand introduced the Campus Accountability and Safety Act to combat sexual assault on college campuses and better support survivors.

Gun policy
Ayotte supported the U.S. Supreme Court's decisions in McDonald v. City of Chicago and District of Columbia v. Heller, which invalidated strict gun laws in Chicago and Washington. In 2006, Ayotte opposed a Republican-backed bill to established a castle doctrine for New Hampshire.

In 2013, Ayotte opposed legislation offered by Senators Joe Manchin and Pat Toomey to mandate background checks for all commercial gun sales. As part of the debate over Manchin-Toomey, Ayotte voted for an amendment which would have increased access to mental health records for background checks and provided funding to prosecute background check violations.  The amendment did not pass.

In June 2016, Ayotte voted against an amendment offered by Senator Chris Murphy which would have required background checks for gun sales at gun shows, over the internet, and between friends and family.  She voted for an amendment to increase funding for the background check system and enhance the definition of "mental competency" for purchasing firearms.  She also voted for two amendments to block or delay the sale of firearms to known or suspected terrorists. All four amendments failed.

While in the Senate, Ayotte supported proposed compromises on contentious gun legislation. She was part of a bipartisan group of eight senators who supported compromise legislation to close the "No Fly, No Buy" loophole and ensure people on the No Fly list are not able to purchase firearms.

Foreign policy

Ayotte chaired the Senate Armed Services Readiness Subcommittee and was a leading voice in the hawkish wing of the Senate Republican Conference.

She opposed the Iran nuclear deal and has called for strict new sanctions on Iran. Ayotte has also backed new sanctions on North Korea in the wake of purported nuclear tests and has called for a tougher stance with Russia.

Israeli–Palestinian conflict
In October 2014, Ayotte wrote an op-ed in The Hill criticizing Mahmoud Abbas, writing that the Palestinian Authority president "has embarked on a destructive course harmful to the prospects for rebuilding Gaza and achieving Israeli–Palestinian peace."

Defense spending
In October 2011, Ayotte sponsored a bill with Senator John McCain to control costs associated with major defense acquisition programs. Ayotte opposes the Defense Department's wishes to retire the U.S.'s fleet of Cold War-era A-10 Thunderbolt II jets and redirect those funds elsewhere. Ayotte argues that there is no adequate replacement for the plane and citing her husband's experiences flying the A-10 while in the Air Force.

Iraq, Syria, and ISIL
Ayotte has criticized President Obama for withdrawing U.S. troops from Iraq in 2011.

In July 2016, Ayotte released a comprehensive plan to defeat ISIS, including a "more aggressive" campaign of U.S. airstrikes against ISIS in Iraq and Syria.

Guantanamo Bay prisoners
Ayotte fought attempts by the Obama administration to try terrorism suspects in civilian federal courts. She opposed the closure of the Guantanamo Bay detention camp and introduced a bill in the Senate that would block the closure of the prison and ban any transfer of detainees to the United States.

Ayotte criticized the August 2015 transfer of 15 prisoners from the Guantanamo Bay detention camp to the United Arab Emirates (UAE), saying that she believed the released prisoners had dangerous ties to terrorism and would return to terrorist activity. She said that the Pentagon told her in 2015 that 93 percent of the detainees in Guantanamo Bay were considered "high risk" for returning to terrorist activities.

Ayotte authored and released an unclassified report that summarized information about the 107 original detainees at Guantanamo Bay, including the detainees' affiliations and terrorist activities prior to their detention. Ayotte has pushed for the Pentagon to publicly disclose more details about the detainees; the Pentagon currently releases only detainees' names and countries where they are transferred.

Personal life
In 2001, Ayotte married Joseph Daley, an Iraq War veteran and former A-10 pilot who flew combat missions in Iraq. Daley is retired from the Air National Guard and owns a small landscaping and snow plow business in Merrimack. They have two children.

Electoral history

See also
 List of female state attorneys general in the United States
 Women in the United States Senate

References

External links

 
 
 

|-

|-

1968 births
21st-century American politicians
21st-century American women politicians
American people of French-Canadian descent
American women lawyers
Female United States senators
Living people
New Hampshire Attorneys General
New Hampshire Independents
New Hampshire Republicans
Politicians from Nashua, New Hampshire
Pennsylvania State University alumni
Republican Party United States senators from New Hampshire
Villanova University School of Law alumni
Women in New Hampshire politics
Conservatism in the United States